Gabriella Zanna Vanessa Anstruther-Gough-Calthorpe (born 8 April 1989), known professionally as Gabriella Wilde or Gabriella Calthorpe, is an English actress and model.

She has appeared in the films St Trinian's 2: The Legend of Fritton's Gold (2009), The Three Musketeers (2011), Carrie (2013), Endless Love (2014), and Wonder Woman 1984 (2020). Her television work includes the Doctor Who episode "The Vampires of Venice" (2010) and the BBC historical drama series Poldark (2016–2019).

Early life
Wilde was born in Basingstoke, Hampshire. She is descended from the aristocratic Gough-Calthorpe family. Her father, businessman John Anstruther-Gough-Calthorpe, is a former chairman of the Watermark Group, and the grandson of Sir Fitzroy Anstruther-Gough-Calthorpe, 1st Baronet. Her mother, Vanessa Mary Theresa (née Hubbard), is the former wife of socialite Sir Dai Llewellyn, 4th Baronet. Vanessa is a former model who sat for David Bailey and John Swannell.

Through her maternal grandfather, Wilde's ancestors include Montagu Bertie, 6th Earl of Abingdon, General the Hon. Thomas Gage, and Stephanus Van Cortlandt, the first native-born Mayor of New York City. Wilde's maternal grandmother's parents were peers Bernard Fitzalan-Howard, 3rd Baron Howard of Glossop and Mona Fitzalan-Howard, 11th Baroness Beaumont.

Wilde has a younger sister, Octavia, as well as five half-siblings: Olivia and Arabella Llewellyn, from her mother's first marriage, and Georgiana, Isabella, and Jacobi, from her father's first marriage, to Lady Mary-Gaye Curzon. She is also "unofficial stepsisters" with Pandora Cooper-Key and Cressida Bonas, Lady Mary-Gaye's other daughters. Isabella, Olivia and Cressida are also actresses.

Wilde and her future husband were both educated at Windlesham House School. Afterwards she attended Heathfield St Mary's School, Ascot and St Swithun's School, Winchester, before leaving to pursue a course in art while continuing with her modelling career. She smuggled vodka into Heathfield, resulting in suspension and a transfer to St Swithun's. She studied fine art at the City and Guilds of London Art School but dropped out to pursue acting.

Career

Wilde began her career as a model. Spotted at age 14 by Naomi Campbell, she joined her agency Premier Model Management and appeared in campaigns for companies including L.K.Bennett, Lacoste, Abercrombie & Fitch, Burberry, Topshop and posed for InStyle, Cosmopolitan, Vogue and Nylon.

In 2007, she was named the second-most-eligible girl in Britain but rejected press attention and the "It girl" label.

In December 2009, Wilde made her acting debut in the adventure comedy film St Trinian's 2: The Legend of Fritton's Gold. In May 2010, Wilde appeared in an episode of the BBC television series Doctor Who as one of the eponymous vampires in "The Vampires of Venice".

In December 2010, Wilde was announced to have been cast in her film debut in the adventure film The Three Musketeers, an adaptation of the novel of the same name. Wilde portrayed the role of the queen's lady-in-waiting Constance Bonacieux and starred alongside Orlando Bloom and Logan Lerman. The film was released in October 2011 and went on to make over $132 million worldwide, but it was poorly received by critics with a rating of 24% on Rotten Tomatoes based on reviews from 90 critics.

In March 2012, Wilde was cast in the ABC Sci-Fi television pilot Dark Horse. The series centers on a science student who learns that he is the chosen one, tasked with destroying the forces of evil. The pilot was not picked up by ABC for the 2012–2013 television season. That same year Wilde starred in the short film Il Maestro and is attached to another film titled Squatters.

As well as Dark Horse, Wilde was cast in the 2013 remake, Carrie, that same month (as Sue Snell). The film was directed by Boys Don't Cry director Kimberly Peirce and starred Chloë Grace Moretz and Julianne Moore. Filming began in June 2012 and it was released in October 2013.

In 2013, Wilde was cast in the second film adaptation of Scott Spencer's novel Endless Love, released 2014, opposite Alex Pettyfer. She played Caroline Penvenen in the BBC drama Poldark from 2015 to 2019.

Wilde joined Estée Lauder as their newest spokesmodel in 2015, becoming the face of the brand's advertising campaigns.

Personal life
Wilde married musician Alan Pownall on 13 September 2014, both previously having attended Windlesham House School. They have three sons.

Ancestry

Filmography

References

External links

 
 

1989 births
21st-century English actresses
English film actresses
Gough-Calthorpe family
Living people
People educated at Heathfield School, Ascot
People educated at St Swithun's School, Winchester
People from Basingstoke
Bertie family
Schuyler family
English people of Dutch descent
Wilde
People educated at Windlesham House School